The Miss Universo Italia 2008 pageant was held on May 31, 2008. The chosen winner will represent the Italy at Miss Universe 2008.

Results
Miss Universo Italia 2008 : Claudia Ferraris

External links
 http://missuniverse.notizie.alice.it/index.html?pmk=notmuinav

Miss Universo Italia
2008 beauty pageants
2008 in Italy